Rao is a Ramu language of western Madang Province, Papua New Guinea. In older literature it was called Annaberg.

References

Middle Ramu languages
Languages of Madang Province